NH 90

 National Highway 90 (India)
 NHI NH90, medium-sized, twin-engine, multi-role military helicopter  manufactured by NHIndustries.